Ostravice is a municipality and village in Frýdek-Místek District in the Moravian-Silesian Region of the Czech Republic. It has about 2,400 inhabitants.

Geography
It lies in the Moravian-Silesian Beskids in the valley of the Ostravice River.

History
The first written mention of Ostravice is from 1581, when it was part of the Hukvaldy estate.

In 1951, the territory of Ostravice and neighbouring Staré Hamry was newly divided.

Economy
Ostravice serves year-round as a tourist resort.

References

Villages in Frýdek-Místek District